Eduard Hackel (17 March 1850, Haida, Bohemia – 2 February 1926, Attersee, Upper Austria) was an Austrian botanist. His father was a veterinarian in Haida (now Nový Bor) in Bohemia. He was married and had one son.

Hackel studied at the Polytechnical Institute in Vienna, and became substitute teacher at a high school in St. Pölten in 1869. He became full professor of natural history there upon obtaining his teaching certificate in 1871 and remained in this position until his retirement in 1900.

Agrostology
He published his first agrostology papers on grasses in 1871 and soon became known as a world expert agrostologist on the grass family (Poaceae). While he himself undertook only a single collecting trip – to Spain and Portugal, he was charged with working up collections of grasses mainly from Japan, Taiwan, New Guinea, Brazil and Argentina.

Apart from agrostologisty systematics, Hackel also contributed to the morphology and histology of members of the grass family.
 
The genus Hackelochloa (Poaceae) is named for him.

Important works 

 Monographia festucarum europeaearum 1864
 Gramineae in Martius’s Flora Brasiliensis, 1883,
 Catalogue raisonné des graminées du Portugal.  1880.

References 

 Detailed biography in Allgemeine deutsche Biographie
 Correspondence with Dr Júlio Henriques, Universidade de Coimbra, Portugal.

External links 
 
 Comprehensive bibliography at WorldCat.
  Works by Hackel in the Biodiversity Heritage Library

19th-century Austrian botanists
Agrostologists
1850 births
1926 deaths
Austrian taxonomists
Botanists with author abbreviations
20th-century Austrian botanists